Raymond Radway (born July 5, 1987) is a former American football wide receiver in the National Football League for the Dallas Cowboys, Chicago Bears and St. Louis Rams. He also was a member of the Los Angeles KISS in the Arena Football League. He played college football at Abilene Christian University.

Early years
Radway attended McKinney North High School, where he practiced football and track. He enrolled at Cloud County Community College. He was named All-American in the 200 and 400 metres.

He transferred to Abilene Christian University after his sophomore season on a track scholarship. In track, he was a four-time NCAA Division II All-American. In 2008, he won the NCAA Division II outdoor championship in the 400 metres.

As a junior in 2009, he was a backup wide receiver, making 8 receptions for 196 yards, before breaking his hand late in the season. 

As a senior in 2010, he started all 12 games, ranking third on the team with 32 receptions for 438 yards and 5 touchdowns. He finished his college career with 40 receptions for 634 yards and 10 touchdowns.

Professional career

Pre-draft

Dallas Cowboys
Radway was signed as an undrafted free agent by the Dallas Cowboys after the 2011 NFL Draft on July 28, because he had an excellent size/speed ratio. He was a pleasant surprise during training camp and had his roster spot assured, until September 1, when in the last preseason contest against the Miami Dolphins, he suffered a broken left fibula and tibia after leaping for a catch during the last 3 seconds of the game. He was then placed on the injured reserve list on September 3.

The injury slowed his development and was eventually waived on August 27, 2012, after he was passed on the depth chart by younger wide receivers Cole Beasley and Andre Holmes. On October 8, he was signed to the team's practice squad, but was cut on October 23.

Chicago Bears
On October 30, 2012, Radway was signed by the Chicago Bears to the practice squad. He was released on November 27.

St. Louis Rams
On December 11, 2012, Radway was signed to the St. Louis Rams' practice squad. He was waived on August 26, 2013.

Los Angeles Kiss (AFL)
On November 1, 2013, Radway was assigned to the Los Angeles KISS of the Arena Football League. He was placed on reassignment on July 8, 2014, after recording 20 receptions for the KISS.

Calgary Stampeders (CFL)
On January 21, 2014, he was signed by the Calgary Stampeders of the Canadian Football League. He was cut on May 8.

References

External links
 Abilene Christian Wildcats bio

1987 births
Living people
Abilene Christian Wildcats men's track and field athletes
Abilene Christian Wildcats football players
American football wide receivers
Dallas Cowboys players
Chicago Bears players
Los Angeles Kiss players
Players of American football from Texas
People from McKinney, Texas